Namio Takasu (born 24 January 1943) is a Japanese professional golfer.

Takasu played on the Japan Golf Tour, winning three times.

Professional wins (6)

Japan Golf Tour wins (3)

*Note: The 1982 Kuzuha Kokusai Tournament was shortened to 27 holes due to weather.

Japan Golf Tour playoff record (1–1)

Other wins (2)
1974 Kuzuha Kokusai Tournament
1985 Toyama Open

Senior wins (1)
2002 Castle Hill Open

Team appearances
World Cup (representing Japan): 1982, 1984

References

External links

Japanese male golfers
Japan Golf Tour golfers
Sportspeople from Chiba Prefecture
1943 births
Living people